Flashback Mornings is a 2002 studio album by The Hobos. The album marked their return to mainstream success with hits like the album’s only single "Walk All Night" and the radio chart-topping "Flying Away".

Flashback Mornings is considered to be the most experimental album of the band to date. The Hobos intentionally dropped their appreciation of American rock and folk elements for a more electronic sound. Distortion sound effects were added to the guitars, creating a unique sound for the band.

Also two videos were filmed for the songs mentioned above. The album is also important as one of the first Digital Media CD’s released in Latvia. As such the disc also features the music video for "Walk All Night".

Track listing 
All songs written by Rolands Ūdris.

"Summer’s Gone" – 3:05
"Flashback Morning" – 3:11
"Walk All Night" – 3:47
"Flying Away" – 3:16
"Information" – 3:27
"Thanks" – 3:46
"Junkie Girl" – 4:27
"Even of You" – 3:39
"Fun" – 2:29
"Too Long to Linger" – 2:22
"Ram Nam" – 3:56
"Lost in Space" – 4:25
"Red Red Sun" – 3:09
"Flashback Mornings" – 0:06

2002 albums
The Hobos albums